The House of Salm-Reifferscheidt-Raitz is a noble family of German descent established in Central Moravia (now part of the Czech Republic). It came into existence after a partition of Salm-Reifferscheidt-Bedburg line in 1734, and was elevated to princely dignity in 1790.

Counts of Salm-Reifferscheidt-Raitz (1734–1790)

 Anton Joseph Franz, Count 1734–1769 (1720-1769), fourth surviving son of Franz Wilhelm I, Count of Salm-Reifferscheidt-Bedburg
  Karl Joseph, Count 1769–1790 (1750-1838), elevated to Reichsfürst 1790

Princes of Salm-Reifferscheidt-Raitz (ruling 1790–1811) 

 Karl Joseph, previously Count, 1st Prince 1790-1838 (1750-1838), mediatized 1811
  Franz Joseph, Hereditary Prince of Salm-Reifferscheidt-Raitz (1776-1836)
  Hugo I, 2nd Prince 1803-1888 (1803-1888)
 Hugo II, 3rd Prince 1888-1890 (1832-1890)
  Hugo III, 4th Prince 1890-1903 (1863-1903)
  Hugo IV, 5th Prince 1903-1946 (1893-1946)
  Hugo V, 6th Prince 1946-1974 (1933-1974)
  Hugo VI, 7th Prince 1974–present (born 1973)
  Prince Erich of Salm-Reifferscheidt-Raitz (1836-1884)
  Prince August of Salm-Reifferscheidt-Raitz (1866-1942)
  Prince Niklas, Count of Salm-Reifferscheidt-Ungnad-Weißenwolff 1969-1970 (1904-1970)
 Prince Niklas, Count of Salm-Reifferscheidt-Ungnad-Weißenwolff 1970-2009 (1942-2009)
 Prince Niklas (born 1972)
  Prince Christoph Niklas (born 2003)
 Prince Paul (born 1979)
  Prince Conrad (born 1985)
 Prince Franz (born 1944)
  Prince Philipp (born 1971)
 Prince Benedikt (born 2012)
  Prince Leopold (born 2013)
  Prince Karl (born 1951)
 Prince Johannes (born 1997)
 Prince Gabriel (born 1998)
  Prince Matthäus (born 2002)

See also
House of Salm

References